The City Church in Oxford, England, is where the mayor and corporation (local government officials) are expected to worship. There have been three churches designated the City Church in Oxford, first established around 1122:

 St Martin's Church, Carfax (c.1122–1896), demolished apart from the tower
 All Saints Church, High Street (1896–1971), deconsecrated and now the library of Lincoln College
 St Michael at the North Gate, Cornmarket (1971 onwards), the present City Church

References 

 

1122 establishments in England
Christianity in Oxford
City Church
Local government in Oxford